The airline industry in Australia began in the early 1920s with Western Australian Airways on the west coast, and Australian Aircraft and Engineering Company on the east coast. In 1921, Queensland and Northern Territory Aerial Services (QANTAS) was formed, and continues to operate.

This is a list of airlines that have a current air operator's certificate issued by the Civil Aviation Safety Authority.

Scheduled airlines

Charter airlines

Cargo airlines

See also
List of defunct airlines of Australia
List of airlines

References

External links
International airlines in Australia
Domestic airlines in Australia

 
Australia
Airlines
Airlines
Australia